F. indicus may refer to:

 Fenneropenaeus indicus, the Indian prawn
 Formiscurra indicus, a species of planthopper

Synonyms 
 Fusinus indicus, a synonym for Marmorofusus tuberculatus, a species of sea snail

See also
 Indicus (disambiguation)